Denise Irene Ramsden (née Castle) (11 February 1952 in Wakefield – 19 April 2003) was an English Olympian sprint athlete of the 1960s and 1970s, running at club level for the Dorothy Hyman Track Club, as a child she attended Stanley St. Peter's School in Stanley, West Riding of Yorkshire.

Denise Ramsden's personal best time for the 100 metres was 11.67 seconds set at Meadowbank Stadium, Edinburgh on 6 August 1976, and her personal best time for the 200 metres was 23.48 seconds set at Crystal Palace, London on 21 August 1976,

Her best time for the 4 × 100 metres relay was in the team running 43.44 seconds for Great Britain and Northern Ireland Olympic team in the 1976 Summer Olympics in the Olympic Stadium, Montreal, Quebec, Canada on 30 July 1976, the team that set the British record and finished eighth in the final was; Wendy Hoyte (née Clarke), Denise Ramsden, Sharon Colyear (née Danville), Andrea Lynch (née Saunders).

She won a bronze medal in the 4 × 100 metres relay, the team running 44.39 seconds for Great Britain and Northern Ireland Athletic team  in the 1969 European Athletics Championships in the Karaiskakis Stadium, Athens, Greece, the team was; Anita Neil, Denise Ramsden, Sheila Cooper, Val Peat (née Wild).

Genealogical information
Denise Ramsden was the niece of the rugby league footballers Malcolm Sampson, and David Sampson, and the cousin of the rugby league footballer Dean Sampson, and rugby union and rugby league footballer Paul Sampson.

References

External links
History of the European Championships 1969 Athens
United Kingdom All-Time Lists - Women (Sprints)
United Kingdom All-Time Lists - Women (Multi-Discipline & Relays)

West Yorkshire has produced 91 Olympians
Stanley History Online - Schools

1952 births
2003 deaths
Athletes (track and field) at the 1976 Summer Olympics
English female sprinters
Olympic athletes of Great Britain
Sportspeople from Wakefield
European Athletics Championships medalists
Olympic female sprinters